Pull Tight or Pulltight may refer to:

Pull Tight, Alabama
Pulltight, Missouri
Pulltight, Indiana